Han Jian may refer to:

 Han Jian (Zhou Dynasty), third head of the House of Han
 Han Jian (Weibo warlord) (died 883), Tang dynasty warlord who governed Weibo Circuit
 Han Jian (Zhenguo warlord) (855–912), Tang dynasty warlord who governed Zhenguo Circuit, also served Later Liang after the end of Tang
 Han Jian (badminton) (born 1956), Chinese badminton player
 Hanjian, in Chinese culture a highly derogatory and pejorative term for a traitor